Stelis canae is a species of orchid plant native to Panama.

References 

canae
Flora of Panama